Governor Cooper may refer to:

Job Adams Cooper (1843–1899), 6th Governor of Colorado
Myers Y. Cooper (1873–1958), 51st Governor of Ohio
Prentice Cooper (1895–1969), 39th Governor of Tennessee
Robert Archer Cooper (1874–1953), 93rd Governor of South Carolina
Roy Cooper (born 1957), 75th Governor of North Carolina
William B. Cooper (Delaware politician) (1771–1849), 32nd Governor of Delaware